Georg Philipp Telemann (1681–1767) was a German composer.

Telemann may also refer to:
 Georg Michael Telemann (1748–1831), German composer and theologian
  (1882–1941), German radiologist and surgeon
 4246 Telemann, an asteroid

See also 
 Teleman